Pete or Peter Weber may refer to:

 Peter Weber (gymnast) (born 1938), German gymnast
 Pete Weber (sportscaster) (born 1951), American sports commentator for the ice hockey team Nashville Predators
 Pete Weber (bowler) (born 1962), American professional bowler
 Peter Weber (handballer) (born 1962), Swiss handball player
 Peter Weber (television personality) (born 1991), American television personality
 Peter Weber, suspect of the Hinterkaifeck murders

See also
 Peter Webber (born 1968), British director